The 19th District of the Iowa Senate is located in southern Iowa, and is currently composed of Polk County.

Current elected officials
Jack Whitver is the senator currently representing the 19th District.

The area of the 19th District contains two Iowa House of Representatives districts:
The 37th District (represented by John Landon)
The 38th District (represented by Garrett Gobble)

The district is also located in Iowa's 3rd congressional district, which is represented by Cindy Axne.

Past senators
The district has previously been represented by:

Norman Goodwin, 1983–1990
Sheldon Rittmer, 1991–2002
Chuck Larson, 2003–2006
Rob Hogg, 2007–2012
Jack Whitver, 2013–present

See also
Iowa General Assembly
Iowa Senate

References

19